1981–82 was the seventh season that Division 1 operated as the second tier of ice hockey in Sweden, below the top-flight Elitserien (now the SHL).

Division 1 was divided into four starting groups, based on geography. The top four teams in the group would continue to the playoffs to determine which clubs would participate in the qualifier for promotion to Elitserien. The bottom  team in each group was relegated directly to Division 2 for the 1982–83 season. The second-to-last place team in each group played in a relegation series to determine their participation in the next season.

Regular season

Northern Group

Western Group

Eastern Group

Southern Group

Playoffs

Second round 
 Kiruna AIF - Nacka HK 0:2 (3:5, 2:3)
 Huddinge IK - IFK Kiruna 2:0 (12:3, 4:3 OT)
 Västerås IK - Mörrums GoIS 2:0 (6:3, 4:1)
 Tingsryds AIF - Bofors IK 1:2 (7:3, 2:5, 3:6)

Second round 
 Luleå HF - Huddinge IK 2:1 (6:5, 2:4, 4:2)
 Södertälje SK - Nacka HK 2:0 (6:2, 3:2)
 Örebro IK - Bofors IK 0:2 (4:7, 3:4)
 HV71 - Västerås IK 2:0 (3:1, 8:3)
 Piteå IF - Hammarby IF 0:2 (2:14, 1:4)
 Mora IK - IF Troja 2:0 (6:4, 5:4)

Third round 
 Luleå HF - HV71 0:2 (6:7, 4:8)
 Södertälje SK - Mora IK 2:0 (8:1, 9:1)
 Bofors IK - Hammarby IF 0:2 (2:4, 1:6)

Elitserien promotion

External links
Historical Division 1 statistics on Svenskhockey.com

Swedish Division I seasons
2
Swe